Clara Tauson won the girls' singles tennis title at the 2019 Australian Open, defeating Leylah Fernandez in the final, 6–4, 6–3.

Liang En-shuo was the defending champion, but she participated in the women's qualifying competition where she lost to Bibiane Schoofs in the first round.

Seeds

Draw

Finals

Top half

Section 1

Section 2

Bottom half

Section 3

Section 4

Qualifying

Seeds

Qualifiers

Lucky loser

Draw

First qualifier

Second qualifier

Third qualifier

Fourth qualifier

Fifth qualifier

Sixth qualifier

Seventh qualifier

Eighth qualifier

References

External links 
 Main draw at ausopen.com
 Draw at itftennis.com

Girls' Singles
Australian Open, 2019 Girls' Singles